Kleg may refer to:

KLEG-CD, low-power television station in Dallas, Texas
Cleg or horse-fly, large, agile fly with bloodsucking females
Clegg (disambiguation)